This is a list of lakes of Kenya.

B

C 

Chew Bahir

E 

Elmenteita

K

L 

Logipi

M 

Magadi

N

T 

Turkana

V 

Victoria

See also 

Kenya
Lakes
Lakes